Trory is a townland (of 335 acres), small village and civil parish in County Fermanagh, Northern Ireland, 3 miles (5 km) north of Enniskillen. The townland is situated in the historic barony of Tirkennedy, but the civil parish covers areas of the barony of Tirkennedy, as well as the barony of Lurg. In the 2001 Census it had (with Ballycassidy and Laragh) a population of 315 people. It lies within the Fermanagh and Omagh District Council area.

St Michael's Church of Ireland Parish Church in Trory is a listed building.

Transport
The ferry to Devenish Island leaves from Trory point about 1.5 miles out of Enniskillen.

Civil parish of Trory

The civil parish includes the small village of Ballycassidy.

Townlands
The civil parish includes the following townlands:

B
Ballycassidy, Buninubber

C
Car Island, Cloghbally, Concrick

D
Derryargon, Derrygore, Derryinch, Drumcoo, Drumgarrow, Drummackilowney

F
Ferny Island

G
Gublusk

H
Hay Island

I
Inish Free

K
Kilmacormick

L
Laragh, Long Island

M
Mossfield (also known as Urbal)

O
Oghill

P
Paris Island Big, Paris Island Little

R
Ring, Rockfield, Rossahilly

S
Shanmullagh, Srahenny

T
Thornhill Glebe, Trasna Island, Trory, Tully, Tullyavy, Tullylone

U
Urbal (also known as Mossfield)

W
White Island

See also 
 List of townlands in County Fermanagh
 List of towns and villages in Northern Ireland
 List of civil parishes of County Fermanagh

References 

Villages in County Fermanagh
Townlands of County Fermanagh